Víťaz is a village and municipality in the Prešov District of the Prešov Region of eastern Slovakia.

History
In historical records the village was first mentioned in 1272.

Geography
The municipality lies at an elevation of 505 metres (1,657 ft) and covers an area of 19.303 km² (4,770 acres). It has a population of about 2000 people.

References

External links
 Víťaz official page
 Official page of Víťaz parish

Villages and municipalities in Prešov District
Šariš